Raymond Sinclair Richmond (June 5, 1896 – October 21, 1969) was a Major League Baseball pitcher who appeared in eight games for the St. Louis Browns in  and .

External links
Baseball Reference.com

1896 births
1969 deaths
St. Louis Browns players
Major League Baseball pitchers
Baseball players from Illinois
Eastern Illinois Panthers baseball players
People from Montgomery County, Illinois